USS Blue Light was a steam tug built for the United States Navy during the American Civil War. She was used by the Union Navy as an ordnance tugboat in support of the Union Navy blockade of Confederate waterways.

Blue Light configured to carry ammunition to Union Navy ships
Blue Light — a screw tug laid down in 1863 by the Portsmouth Navy Yard in Kittery, Maine — was launched on February 27, 1864 and fitted out to carry ammunition from magazines ashore to warships anchored far out in harbors where they would not endanger people and property on the waterfront.

Assigned to the Boston Navy Yard throughout the war
The little steamer was assigned to the Boston Navy Yard and operated at that base through the end of the Civil War, supplying ammunition to Union warships preparing for operations along the Confederate coast or on the South's inland waters.

Post-Civil War operations
Following the collapse of the Confederacy, Blue Light continued to perform duty as an ordnance tug at Boston, Massachusetts, until 1870. From 1871-June 1873, she served as a yard tug at the Washington Navy Yard.

Since no logs recording the vessel's operations before this time apparently up to this point are extant, Blue Light served the Navy in a non-commissioned status. The tug was placed in commission at Washington, D.C. on June 27, 1873 and, the following day, sailed for the coast of Maine to perform special service under the United States Commissioner on Fish and Fisheries. At the end of this assignment, she arrived at Portsmouth, New Hampshire on September 6, and she was decommissioned there on the 13th.

Final operations, decommissioning, and sale
Recommissioned on June 12, 1874, the ship proceeded to New London, Connecticut, for a tour of duty as a yard tug which lasted until Blue Light was decommissioned again on September 30, 1875 and laid up into 1879. No records of her status for the following four years seem to have survived, but we do know that the tug was sold at Great Neck, New York on September 27, 1883.

References

Ships of the Union Navy
Steamships of the United States Navy
Tugs of the United States Navy
Ammunition ships of the United States Navy
American Civil War auxiliary ships of the United States
Ships built in Kittery, Maine
1864 ships